The Baltic nation of Lithuania is home to several protected areas, which receive protection because of their environmental, cultural or similar value. 
In addition  of marine area protected, or 25.59% of the country’s territorial waters. Total number of protected areas — 1060. In Lithuania there are 6 Strict Nature Reserves, 5 National Parks, 404  Managed Nature Reserves and 7  Ramsar sites.

Strict nature reserves 
In Lithuania there are 6 strict nature reserves. 
Cepkeliu Valstybinis Gamtinis Rezervatas
Dubravos Rezervatine Apyrube
Kamanu Valstybinis Gamtinis Rezervatas
Viesviles Valstybinis Gamtinis Rezervatas
Vilniaus Piliu Valstybinis Kulturinis Rezervatas
Zuvinto Biosferos Rezervatas

Managed reserves
In Lithuania there are 405 managed nature reserves.

National parks

Regional parks

Ramsar sites 
In Lithuania there are 7 Ramsar sites. 
 Adutiskis-Svyla-Birveta Wetland Complex
 Cepkeliai
 Girutiskis bog
 Kamanos
 Nemunas Delta
 Viesvilé
 Zuvintas

See also 
 List of national parks of Lithuania
 Environmental issues in Lithuania

References

Nature reserves
Lithuania
Protected areas of Lithuania
Protected areas